The navigational algorithms are the quintessence of the executable software on portable calculators or PDA as an aid to the art of navigation, this attempt article describe both algorithms and software for "PC-PDA" implementing different calculation procedures for navigation .
The calculation power obtained by the languages: Basic, "C", Java, etc. .., from portable calculators or PDAs , has made it possible to develop programs that allow calculating the position without the need for tables, in fact they have some basic tables with the correction factors for each year and calculate the values "on the fly" at runtime .

Comparison between manual calculation methods and the use of calculators 

 The traditional methods require bulky and expensive nautical tables (which must be updated), pencil and paper, and calculation time, following the working algorithms.
 Calculators (and the like) do not need books (they have tables and ephemeris integrated) and, with their own algorithms, allow quick and error-free calculation of navigation problems.

Types of algorithms 
 Celestial navigation: Sight reduction, circle of equal altitude, Line Of Position, Fix...
 Positional astronomy: RA, GHA, Dec
 Coastal navigation: Range, Bearing, Horizontal angles, IALA...
 Sailings: Rhumbs, Loxodromic, Orthodromic, Meridional parts...
 Weather, tides
 Software PC- PDA: Nautical Almanac, Sailings, Variation, Sextant corrections

Programs for general navigation 

Programs on the nautical chart, directions, coastal navigation and beacons, nautical publications. The astronomical navigation section includes the resolution of the position triangle, the usefulness of a height line, the recognition of stars and the determinant of the height line, in addition to other topics of interest in nautical: tides, naval kinematics, meteorology and hurricanes, and oceanography. All heading measurements made with a magnetic compass or compass must be corrected for magnetic declination or local variation.

Coordinate conversion subroutine 
 sub Rectang2Polar (a as double, b as double) static
  '----- Subprograma para convertir un vector de estado coord.cartesianas
  '----- En vector de estado en coord.polars.
  '----- De entrada: vector de estado en coord.cartesianes
  '----- De salida: vector de estado en coord.polars.
  '----- NOTA: El vector de velocidad polar es el de la velocidad total,
  '----- Corregido por el efecto de la latitud.
  '------------------------------------------------- ------------------------
  mar x as double
  mar y as double
  mar z as double
  mar x_dot as double
  mar y_dot as double
  mar z_dot as double
  mar rho as double
  mar r as double
  mar lambda as double
  mar beta as double
  mar lambda_dot as double
  mar beta_dot as double
  mar r_dot as double
  x = a (1)
  y = a (2)
  z = a (3)
  x_dot = a (4)
  y_dot = a (5)
  z_dot = a (6)
  rho = sqr (x * x+y * y)
  r = sqr (rho * rho+z * z)
  lambda = atan2 (y, x)
  beta = atan2 (z, rho)
  if (z <0 #) then beta = beta - TWOPI
  yf rho = 0 # then
    lambda_dot = 0 #
      beta_dot = 0 #
  else
    lambda_dot = (x * y_dot - y * x_dot)/(rho * rho)
      beta_dot = (z_dot * rho * rho - z * (x * x_dot+_
                   y * y_dot))/(r * r * rho)
  end if
  r_dot = (x * x_dot+y * y_dot+z * z_dot)/r
  '----- Componentes del vector de posición
  b (1) = lambda
  if b (1)> = TWOPI then b (1) = b (1) - TWOPI
  b (2) = beta
  b (3) = r
  '----- Componentes del vector velocidad total
  b (4) = r * lambda_dot * cuerpo (beta)
  b (5) = r * beta_dot
  b (6) = r_dot
 end sub

Programs for astronomical navigation 
Advanced navigation algorithms include piloting and astronomical navigation: loxodromia and orthodromia. Height correction of the sextant . Astronomical position with calculator, template and blank mercantile chart. Position by 2 Lines of Height. Position from n Height Lines. Vector equation of the Height Circle. Position for vector solution from two observations. Position by Height Circles: matrix solution. And articles related to ancient procedures such as obtaining latitude by the pole star, the meridian, the method of lunar distances , etc.

Programs for the "Nautical Almanac" 
Ephemerides of the celestial bodies used in navigation.
 GHA - Greenwich Hour Angle
 Dec - Declination
 SD  - Semidiameter
 HP  - Horizontal Parallax

 s the solution for course and SOG.

CelestialFix 
They solve the problem of calculating the position from observations of the stars made with the sextant in Astronomical Navigation.

Algorithm implementation:

For n = 2 observations
An analytical solution of the two star sight problem of celestial navigation, James A. Van Allen.
 Vector Solution for the Intersection of two Circles of Equal Altitude. Andrés Ruiz.
For n ≥ 2 observations
 DeWit/USNO Nautical Almanac/Compac Data, Least squares algorithm for n LOPs
 Kaplan algorithm, USNO. For n ≥ 8 observations, gives the solution for course and SOG.

Magnetic declination 

Any measure of course made with a magnetic compass must be corrected because of the magnetic declination or local variation.

See also 
 Navigation
 Celestial navigation
 Nautical almanac
 Lunar distance (navigation)
 Sextant
 American Practical Navigator
 Rhumbline network
 Royal Institute of Navigation (Journal of Navigation)
 Institute of Navigation (NAVIGATION journal)
 Shortest path problem and automotive navigation, for navigational algorithms in other domains.

References

External links 

 Vector Solution for the Intersection of Two Circles of Equal Altitude, Andrés Ruiz.
 Journal of Navigation (en inglés)
 The Institute of Navigation (en inglés)
 Navigational Algorithms

Navigation
Celestial navigation